Krzysztof Ignaczak (born 15 May 1978) is a Polish former professional volleyball player. He was a member of the Poland national team in 1998–2014. A participant at the Olympic Games (Athens 2004, Beijing 2008, London 2012), the 2014 World Champion, 2012 World League winner, and the 2009 European Champion.

Personal life
Krzysztof Ignaczak was born in Wałbrzych, Poland. He is married to Iwona. They have two children: a son, Sebastian, and a daughter, Dominika (who was born after the European Championship 2009). His best friend was volleyball player Arkadiusz Gołaś, who died in a tragic car accident in 2005. Since then Ignaczak played with his shirt number – 16.

Career

Clubs
With BOT Skra Bełchatów he achieved three titles of Polish Champion and won Polish Cup three times.

In 2012 after seven-year domination of PGE Skra Bełchatów, he won with Asseco Resovia Rzeszów title of Polish Champion. In next year his team and he replied this success and gained second title of Polish Champions 2013.). In season 2013/2014 won Polish SuperCup 2013 and Asseco Resovia Rzeszów, including Ignaczak, lost with PGE Skra Bełchatów in the final of Polish Championship and gained silver medal. On 29 March 2015 his team lost in final of 2014–15 CEV Champions League and achieved silver medal. In April 2015 Ignaczak won third title of Polish Champion with Asseco Resovia and sixth title in career. On 21 September 2016 Ignaczak ended up his sporting career and announced it on media.

Despite previously having announced the end of his sporting career, he decided to sign a contract for the rest of the season with the team IBB Polonia London in the English volleyball league on 10 March 2017. His presence, as current World Champion, at the club serves to promote volleyball in Great Britain and in the world.

National team
Krzysztof was in the Polish squad when the Polish national team won the gold medal at the European Championship 2009. On 14 September 2009 he was awarded the Order of Polonia Restituta. The Order was conferred on the following day by the Prime Minister of Poland, Donald Tusk. In 2011 he gained three medals with the Polish team – silver at the World Cup, bronze at the European Championship and bronze at the World League in Gdańsk, Poland, where he also won an award for Best Libero. On 8 July 2012 he won a gold medal at the World League 2012 in Sofia, Bulgaria. On 21 September 2014 the Polish national team, including Ignaczak, won the title of World Champion 2014. On 27 October 2014 he received a state award granted by the Polish President Bronisław Komorowski – Officer's Cross of Polonia Restituta for outstanding sports achievements and worldwide promotion of Poland. After the World Championship, he announced he is retiring from his career in the national team.

Honours

Clubs
 CEV Champions League
  2014/2015 – with Asseco Resovia
 CEV Cup
  2011/2012 – with Asseco Resovia
 National championships
 2004/2005  Polish Cup, with KPS Skra Bełchatów
 2004/2005  Polish Championship, with KPS Skra Bełchatów
 2005/2006  Polish Cup, with BOT Skra Bełchatów
 2005/2006  Polish Championship, with BOT Skra Bełchatów
 2006/2007  Polish Cup, with BOT Skra Bełchatów
 2006/2007  Polish Championship, with BOT Skra Bełchatów
 2011/2012  Polish Championship, with Asseco Resovia
 2012/2013  Polish Championship, with Asseco Resovia
 2013/2014  Polish SuperCup, with Asseco Resovia
 2014/2015  Polish Championship, with Asseco Resovia
 2016/2017  English Cup, with IBB Polonia London
 2016/2017  English Championship, with IBB Polonia London

Youth national team
 1996  CEV U20 European Championship
 1997  FIVB U21 World Championship

Individual awards
 2010: Polish Cup – Best Receiver
 2011: FIVB World League – Best Libero
 2012: FIVB World League – Best Libero
 2012: Olympic Games – Best Receiver
 2012: Polish Cup – Best Defender
 2015: Polish Cup – Best Defender

State awards
 2009:  Knight's Cross of Polonia Restituta
 2014:  Officer's Cross of Polonia Restituta

References

External links

 
 Player profile at PlusLiga.pl 
 Player profile at Volleybox.net 
 
 

1978 births
Living people
People from Wałbrzych
Sportspeople from Lower Silesian Voivodeship
Polish men's volleyball players
Polish Champions of men's volleyball
Olympic volleyball players of Poland
Volleyball players at the 2004 Summer Olympics
Volleyball players at the 2008 Summer Olympics
Volleyball players at the 2012 Summer Olympics
Knights of the Order of Polonia Restituta
Officers of the Order of Polonia Restituta
Polish expatriate sportspeople in England
Expatriate volleyball players in England
AZS Częstochowa players
Skra Bełchatów players
Resovia (volleyball) players
Liberos